
This is a list of players who graduated from the Buy.com Tour in 2002. The top 15 players on the Buy.com Tour's money list in 2002 earned their PGA Tour card for 2003.

*PGA Tour rookie for 2003.
#Moore received a battlefield promotion to the PGA Tour in 2002 by winning three tournaments on the Buy.com Tour in 2002. On the PGA Tour in 2002 he played one tournament, missing the cut at the Southern Farm Bureau Classic.
T = Tied
Green background indicates the player retained his PGA Tour card for 2004 (finished inside the top 125).
Red background indicates the player did not retain his PGA Tour card for 2004 (finished outside the top 150).

Runners-up on the PGA Tour in 2003

See also
2002 PGA Tour Qualifying School graduates

References
Money list
Player profiles

Korn Ferry Tour
PGA Tour
Buy.com Tour Graduates
Buy.com Tour Graduates